Arthur C. Gooding (June 20, 1871 – August 9, 1971) was an American businessman and politician.

Born in Rochester, Minnesota, Gooding graduated from Rochester High School. He was in the banking business. During World War I, Gooding was the food and fuel administrators. He also served on the Minnesota War Council for Olmsted County, Minnesota. Gooding served on the Rochester Library board. he also served on the Rochester School Board. From 1916 to 1917, Gooding served as the Minnesota State Treasurer and was a Republican. From 1919 to 1922, Gooding served in the Minnesota State Senate. Gooding died in a hospital in Rochester, Minnesota.

Notes

1871 births
1971 deaths
Politicians from Rochester, Minnesota
Businesspeople from Minnesota
State treasurers of Minnesota
School board members in Minnesota
Republican Party Minnesota state senators
American centenarians
Men centenarians